The 2020 Arkansas Razorbacks baseball team represented the University of Arkansas in the 2020 NCAA Division I baseball season. The Razorbacks were coached by Dave Van Horn, in his 18th season with the Razorbacks, and played their home games at Baum–Walker Stadium.

On March 17, 2020, the season was officially declared over due to the COVID-19 pandemic. The Razorbacks had a record of 11–5 when the season was cancelled.

Preseason
The Razorbacks played a two-game fall exhibition schedule; the Razorbacks opened on September 20 against Oklahoma at home, falling 3–4 in 14 innings. On October 12, the Hogs traveled to Allie P. Reynolds Stadium in Stillwater, Oklahoma to take on Oklahoma State, to whom they lost 2–7 in 14 innings.

Preseason All-American teams
1st team
Heston Kjerstad - Outfielder (Perfect Game)
Casey Martin - Shortstop (Perfect Game)
Heston Kjerstad - Outfielder (Collegiate Baseball)
Heston Kjerstad - Outfielder (Baseball America)
Casey Martin - Shortstop (Baseball America)
2nd team
Casey Martin - Shortstop (Collegiate Baseball)
3rd team
Casey Opitz - Catcher (Baseball America)

Personnel

Roster

Coaching staff

Schedule and results
The full schedule, including all games that were scheduled but not played, is listed below.

February

Eastern Illinois weekend series

The Razorbacks opened their 2020 season with a weekend series at home against the Eastern Illinois Panthers, starting Friday, February 14. Arkansas received preseason rankings of #7 by D1Baseball, #9 by Collegiate Baseball, and #11 by Baseball America. First pitch on opening day was be at 3:00 p.m. CST, followed by 2:00 p.m. on Saturday and 1:00 p.m. on Sunday.

Connor Noland started the season on the mound for the Hogs; after allowing a leadoff single, he retired the next two batters on strikes and the third out came by way of a pickoff. In the bottom of the first, preseason All-American Heston Kjerstad drove in an RBI with a single to left field, giving the Razorbacks an early lead. The next three innings were scoreless for both teams, but the Arkansas offense came back to life in the fifth. Christian Franklin, with two outs, launched a two-run home run deep, scoring himself and Braydon Webb and giving the Hogs a 3–0 lead. Kjerstad added to the lead five pitches later with a home run of his own, extending the lead to four runs. EIU found the scoreboard in the top of the seventh on a fielding error, but Kjerstad made up for it with another solo home run, his second of the contest. From there, the Razorbacks were able to hold the score at 5–1 for an opening day win. For his  innings of work, Noland received the win; he threw 86 pitches. Marshall Denton ( innings) and Kevin Kopps (1 inning) also spend time on the mound for the Hogs. Will Klein was the losing pitcher; he was in the game for  innings and was relieved by Blayke Cutts for the last  innings of the contest.

Gonzaga weekend series

The Razorbacks' second weekend series of the year will be at home against the Gonzaga Bulldogs, with the first game on Thursday, February 20. Thursday and Friday's games will begin at 3:00 p.m., Saturday's at 2:00 p.m., and Sunday's at 1:00 p.m.

Shriners College Classic, games 1–2

The Razorbacks will close out February with an appearance in the Shriners College Classic, held in Houston. They will open tournament play against the Oklahoma Sooners on Friday, February 28; first pitch will be at 3:00 p.m.

The Razorbacks' second tournament matchup will be on Saturday, February 29 against the Texas Longhorns, with first pitch at 7:00 p.m.

March

Shriners College Classic, game 3

The Razorbacks will close tournament play on Sunday, March 1, when they take on Baylor at 7:00 p.m.

Illinois State midweek game

The Razorbacks will return home to play a midweek game on Tuesday, March 3, when they take on Illinois State at 3:00 p.m.

Rankings

2020 MLB Draft

References

Arkansas
Arkansas Razorbacks baseball seasons
Arkansas Razorbacks baseball